Young Malang is a 2013 Punjabi language Indian romantic comedy film, directed by Rajdeep Singh, written by Manshendra Kailey and produced by Rahulinder Singh Sidhu. The film stars Yuvraj Hans, Neetu Singh, Vinaypal Buttar, Anita Kailey, Balli Riar and Anjana Sukhani, and debuted 20 September 2013. Singers Mika, Javed Ali, Shafqat Amanat Ali and three actors in the movie, Yuvraj Hans, Balli Riar and Vinaypal Buttar, have sung the songs in the flick. The film marks singer Balli Riar's debut in Punjabi films.

Cast
 Balli Riar as Jaskaran Brar
 Yuvraj Hans as Jazz
 Vinaypal Buttar as Kashmeer Singh
 Anita Kailey as Annie
 Neetu Singh as Brittany Begowal
 Anjana Sukhani as Kiran
 Yograj Singh as Maulla Jatt
 Chacha Raunki Ram as Prof. Laathi
 Leena Sidhu
 Mathira as Dancer in the Song ''Lakk Ch Current''
 Kiran Kumar
 Tej Sapru
 Aryajeet Sapru
 Sunita Dhir

Production
It was announced in April 2013 that filming had commenced and would continue on primary locations in Chandigarh, Zirakpur, Kasauli, Himachal Pradesh, with some shooting taking place in Italy. Producer Rahulinder Singh Sidhu, who made a career change from politics to film production with this project, explained the spirit behind the film's name, stating "It's not just a title; it's a state of mind. Those who are young will relate to it and those who are not so young will be able to take a nostalgic trip down the memory lane".

Music
The songs of this film were sung by Mika, Javed Ali, Shafqat Amanat Ali, Sonu Kakkar, and J Riaz, along with the songs by the heroes of the film Yuvraj Hans, Balli Riar & Vinaypal Buttar. Young Malang introduced the trio of Raptilez 1O1, the Punjabi Rap Group that "rocked the nation" with their appearance on India's Got Talent.

Soundtrack
"Young Malang", Singer: Mika Singh, Music: Gurmeet Singh, Lyricist: Daljit Singh 
"Chori Chori", Singer': Javed Ali, Music: Vicky Bhoi, Lyricist: Rajdeep Singh 
 "Hawa Vich Mehkan", Singer: Vinaypal Buttar, Music: Gurmeet Singh, Lyricist: Vinaypal Buttar
 "Ishq Di Kitaab", Singer: Gurmeet Singh, Music: Gurmeet Singh, Lyricist: Sandy Kharal
 "Sapno Ka Saya", Singers: Vicky Bhoi, Yuvraj Hans, Vinaypal Buttar, Raptilez 1O1, Music: Vicky Bhai, Lyricist: Gurjinder Dhillon, Raptilez 1O1
 "Rabb Janda Hai", Singer: J Riaz, Music :Gurmoh Lyricist: Gurjeet Khosa
 "Ishq Di Kitaab", Singer: Navraj Hans, Music: Gurmeet Singh, Lyricist: Sandy kharal
 "Doli", Singer: Vicky Bhoi, Music: Vicky Bhai, Lyricist: Gurjinder Dhillon
 "Preetma", Singers: Vicky Bhoi, Shallu Jain, Music: Vicky Bhai, Lyricist: Prem Chand
 "Lakk Ch Current", Singer:

Reception
The first review to come out for the film was mixed where the reviewer gave the film 3 stars. The reviewer wrote "Technically, the film will surprise you", offering that the film was "on par with any Bollywood film". They noted that the film's producer, "has left no stone unturned in giving the film a grand look and together as a team, producer and director have employed some of the best technicians for the film." The reviewer concluded, "Overall, Very Good!"

References

External links
 
 'Lakk Ch Current - Mathira Item song in Punjabi film
 Young Malang trailer

2013 films
2013 romantic comedy films
Films shot in Chandigarh
Films shot in Himachal Pradesh
Films shot in Italy
Punjabi-language Indian films
2010s Punjabi-language films
Indian romantic comedy films